10 Anti-Aircraft Regiment is an anti-aircraft artillery regiment of the South African Army.

History

Origin
10 Anti-Aircraft Regiment was formally established on 1 February 1968 as though it was a new unit of the Permanent Force, without any mention of the fact that it was obviously a reconstruction of 10 Anti-Aircraft Battery.

Its headquarters was at Youngsfield in Cape Town, where the Artillery Air Defence School had been established from the same date.

Incidents
13 October 2007: An Oerlikon GDF Mk.5 35 mm anti-aircraft twin-barrelled gun malfunctioned, spraying hundreds of high-explosive 0,5 kg 35mm cannon shells around the five-gun firing position. By the time the gun had emptied its dual 250-round magazines, nine soldiers were dead and eleven injured. The accident occurred just before 9 am, when a battery from 10 Anti-Aircraft Regiment began a live-fire exercise at the Army Combat Training Centre at Lohatlha as part of the SANDF's Exercise Seboka.

Starstreak missile development
10 AA Regiment participated in the first live firing of Starstreak missiles on African soil. This firing took place at the Denel Overberg Test Range.

On 24 September 2020, General Officer Commanding Interim Provincial Command KwaZulu-Natal, Brigadier General Siphiwo Dlomo, visited the incoming Bravo Company of 10 Anti-Aircraft Regiment at Ndumo, where it was arriving to take part in South African National Defence Force operations in support of the SA Government response to the COVID-19 pandemic in South Africa. The purpose of the visit was to welcome the company and to consider command and control aspects as the unit is co-located with other Operation NOTLELA elements.

Equipment
Historical
10 Anti-Aircraft Regiment has used the following equipment throughout its history:
 40mm Bofors, 
 3.7 inch heavy AA gun 
 GA1-CO1 20mm light gun 
 GDF-002 twin 35mm automatic gun with Super Fledermaus fire control system 
 ZU-23-2 twin 23mm and 
 20/3 M55 A2 anti-aircraft guns 
Current
 GDF-005 twin 35mm gun with the  Skyshield fire control system
 Starstreak ground-to-air missile

Insignia

Previous Dress Insignia

References

Artillery regiments of South Africa
Air defence units and formations
Military units and formations in Kimberley
Military units and formations established in 1968
1968 establishments in South Africa